Board and care may refer to:
Board and Care, a 1979 Oscar-winning short film about two lovers with Down syndrome
Board and care home, also called a nursing home